"Your Man Loves You Honey" is a song written and recorded by American country music artist Tom T. Hall. It was released in April 1977 as the lead single from the album, About Love. The song peaked at number four on the U.S. country singles chart and at number 11 on the Canadian country singles chart.

Chart performance

References

External links 
 

1977 singles
Tom T. Hall songs
Songs written by Tom T. Hall
Song recordings produced by Jerry Kennedy
1977 songs